Arroes (variant: Santa María de Arroes ) is one of 41 parishes (administrative divisions) in Villaviciosa, a municipality within the province and autonomous community of Asturias, in northern Spain.

References

Parishes in Villaviciosa